Mayo Lake is a reservoir located in northeastern Person County, North Carolina.  Boating entrance, walking trails, swimming access, picnic and camp site areas (collectively known as Mayo Park) are accessed from Neals Store Road about 9 miles north of the city of Roxboro along NC 49.   It is smaller than Hyco Lake (located on the northwestern side of Person County).

Also known as Mayo Reservoir, it was created by a dam impoundment of Mayo Creek (not to be confused with the Mayo River).

The lake's shoreline is maintained in a natural state.

References

External links
 

Reservoirs in North Carolina
Protected areas of Person County, North Carolina
Rivers of Person County, North Carolina